Éva Miklósfalvy (born 10 December 1959) is a Hungarian swimmer. She competed in two events at the 1980 Summer Olympics.

References

1959 births
Living people
Hungarian female swimmers
Olympic swimmers of Hungary
Swimmers at the 1980 Summer Olympics
Swimmers from Budapest